A bastion fort or trace italienne (a phrase derived from non-standard French, literally meaning Italian outline) is a fortification in a style that evolved during the early modern period of gunpowder when the cannon came to dominate the battlefield. It was first seen in the mid-fifteenth century in Italy. Some types, especially when combined with ravelins and other outworks, resembled the related star fort of the same era.

The design of the fort is normally a polygon with bastions at the corners of the walls. These outcroppings eliminated protected blind spots, called "dead zones", and allowed fire along the curtain from positions protected from direct fire. Many bastion forts also feature cavaliers, which are raised secondary structures based entirely inside the primary structure.

Origins 

Their predecessors, medieval fortresses, were usually placed on high hills. From there, arrows were shot at the enemies. The enemies' hope was to either ram the gate or climb over the wall with ladders and overcome the defenders. For the invading force, these fortifications proved quite difficult to overcome, and accordingly, fortresses occupied a key position in warfare.

Passive ring-shaped (Enceinte) fortifications of the Medieval era proved vulnerable to damage or destruction when attackers directed cannon fire on to perpendicular masonry wall. In addition, attackers that could get close to the wall were able to conduct undermining operations in relative safety, as the defenders could not shoot at them from nearby walls, until the development of Machicolation. In contrast, the bastion fortress was a very flat structure composed of many triangular bastions, specifically designed to cover each other, and a ditch. To counteract the cannonballs, defensive walls were made lower and thicker. To counteract the fact that lower walls were easier to climb, the ditch was widened so that attacking infantry were still exposed to fire from a higher elevation, including enfilading fire from the bastions. 

The outer side of the ditch was usually provided with a glacis to deflect cannonballs aimed at the lower part of the main wall. Further structures, such as ravelins, tenailles, hornworks or crownworks, and even detached forts could be added to create complex outer works to further protect the main wall from artillery, and sometimes provide additional defensive positions. They were built of many materials, usually earth and brick, as brick does not shatter on impact from a cannonball as stone does.

Bastion fortifications were further developed in the late fifteenth and early sixteenth centuries, primarily in response to the French invasion of the Italian peninsula. The French army was equipped with new cannon and bombards that were easily able to destroy traditional fortifications built in the Middle Ages. Star forts were employed by Michelangelo in the defensive earthworks of Florence, and refined in the sixteenth century by Baldassare Peruzzi and Vincenzo Scamozzi. The design spread out of Italy in the 1530s and 1540s.

It was employed heavily throughout Europe for the following three centuries. Italian engineers were heavily in demand throughout Europe to help build the new fortifications. The late-seventeenth-century architects Menno van Coehoorn and especially Vauban, Louis XIV's military engineer, are considered to have taken the form to its logical extreme. "Fortresses... acquired ravelins and redoubts, bonnettes and lunettes, tenailles and tenaillons, counterguards and crownworks and hornworks and curvettes and fausse brayes and scarps and cordons and banquettes and counterscarps..."

The star-shaped fortification had a formative influence on the patterning of the Renaissance ideal city: "The Renaissance was hypnotized by one city type which for a century and a half—from Filarete to Scamozzi—was impressed upon all utopian schemes: this is the star-shaped city." In the 19th century, the development of the explosive shell changed the nature of defensive fortifications. Elvas, in Portugal is considered by some to be the best surviving example of the Dutch school of fortifications.

Slopes
When the newly-effective manoeuvrable siege cannon came into military strategy in the fifteenth century, the response from military engineers was to arrange for the walls to be embedded into ditches fronted by earthen slopes (glacis) so that they could not be attacked by destructive direct fire and to have the walls topped by earthen banks that absorbed and largely dissipated the energy of plunging fire. Where conditions allowed, as in Fort Manoel in Malta, the ditches were cut into the native rock, and the wall at the inside of the ditch was simply unquarried native rock. As the walls became lower, they also became more vulnerable to assault.

Dead zone
The rounded shape that had previously been dominant for the design of turrets created "dead space", or "dead zones", which were relatively sheltered from defending fire, because direct fire from other parts of the defences could not be directed around curved walls. To prevent this, what had previously been round or square turrets were extended into diamond-shaped points to eliminate potential cover for attacking troops. The ditches and walls channelled the attackers into carefully constructed zwinger, bailey, or similar "kill zone" areas where the attackers had no place to shelter from the fire of the defenders.

Enfilade
A further and more subtle change was to move from a passive model of defence to an active one. The lower walls were more vulnerable to being stormed, and the protection that the earthen banking provided against direct fire failed if the attackers could occupy the slope on the outside of the ditch and mount an attacking cannon there. Therefore, the shape was designed to make maximum use of enfilade (or flanking) fire against any attackers who should reach the base of any of the walls. The indentations in the base of each point on the star sheltered cannons. Those cannons would have a clear line of fire directly down the edge of the neighbouring points, while their point of the star was protected by fire from the base of those points. The evolution of these ideas can be seen in transitional fortifications such as Sarzana in northwest Italy.

Other changes

Thus forts evolved complex shapes that allowed defensive batteries of cannon to command interlocking fields of fire. Forward batteries commanded the slopes which defended walls deeper in the complex from direct fire. The defending cannon were not simply intended to deal with attempts to storm the walls, but to actively challenge attacking cannon and deny them approach close enough to the fort to engage in direct fire against the vulnerable walls.

The key to the fort's defence moved to the outer edge of the ditch surrounding the fort, known as the covered way, or covert way. Defenders could move relatively safely in the cover of the ditch and could engage in active countermeasures to keep control of the glacis, the open slope that lay outside the ditch, by creating defensive earthworks to deny the enemy access to the glacis and thus to firing points that could bear directly onto the walls and by digging counter mines to intercept and disrupt attempts to mine the fort walls.

Compared to medieval fortifications, forts became both lower and larger in area, providing defence in depth, with tiers of defences that an attacker needed to overcome in order to bring cannon to bear on the inner layers of defences.

Firing emplacements for defending cannon were heavily defended from bombardment by external fire, but open towards the inside of the fort, not only to diminish their usefulness to the attacker should they be overcome, but also to allow the large volumes of smoke that the defending cannon would generate to dissipate.

Fortifications of this type continued to be effective while the attackers were armed only with cannon, where the majority of the damage inflicted was caused by momentum from the impact of solid shot. Because only low explosives such as black powder were available, explosive shells were largely ineffective against such fortifications. The development of mortars, high explosives, and the consequent large increase in the destructive power of explosive shells and thus plunging fire rendered the intricate geometry of such fortifications irrelevant. Warfare was to become more mobile. It took, however, many years to abandon the old fortress thinking.

Construction 
Bastion forts were very expensive. Amsterdam's 22 bastions cost 11 million florins, and Siena in 1544 bankrupted itself to pay for its defences. For this reason, bastion forts were often improvised from earlier defences. Medieval curtain walls were torn down, and a ditch was dug in front of them. The earth used from the excavation was piled behind the walls to create a solid structure. While purpose-built fortifications would often have a brick fascia because of the material's ability to absorb the shock of artillery fire, many improvised defences cut costs by leaving this stage out and instead opting for more earth. Improvisation could also consist of lowering medieval round towers and infilling them with earth to strengthen the structures.

It was also often necessary to widen and deepen the ditch outside the walls to create a more effective barrier to frontal assault and mining. Engineers from the 1520s were also building massive, gently sloping banks of earth called glacis in front of ditches so that the walls were almost totally hidden from horizontal artillery fire. The main benefit of the glaces was to deny enemy artillery the ability to fire point-blank. The lower the angle of elevation, the higher the stopping power.

The first key instance of a trace Italianate was at the Papal port of Civitavecchia, where the original walls were lowered and thickened because the stone tended to shatter under bombardment.

Effectiveness 
The first major battle which truly showed the effectiveness of trace Italienne was the defence of Pisa in 1500 against a combined Florentine and French army. With the original medieval fortifications beginning to crumble to French cannon fire, the Pisans constructed an earthen rampart behind the threatened sector. It was discovered that the sloping earthen rampart could be defended against escalade and was also much more resistant to cannon fire than the curtain wall it had replaced.

The second siege was that of Padua in 1509. A monk engineer named Fra Giocondo, trusted with the defence of the Venetian city, cut down the city's medieval wall and surrounded the city with a broad ditch that could be swept by flanking fire from gun ports set low in projections extending into the ditch. Finding that their cannon fire made little impression on these low ramparts, the French and allied besiegers made several bloody and fruitless assaults and then withdrew.

The new type of fortification also played a role in the numerous Mediterranean wars, slowing down the Ottoman expansion. Although Rhodes had been partially upgraded to the new type of fortifications after the 1480 siege, it was still conquered in 1522; nevertheless it was a long and bloody siege, and the besieged had no hope of outside relief because the island was close to the Ottoman power base and far from any allies. On the other hand, the Ottomans failed to take Corfu in 1537 in no small part because of the new fortifications, and several attempts spanning almost two centuries (another major one was in 1716) also failed.

Two star forts were built by the Order of Saint John on the island of Malta in 1552, Fort Saint Elmo and Fort Saint Michael. Fort Saint Elmo played a critical role in the Ottoman siege of 1565 when it managed to hold out heavy bombardment for over a month. Eventually it fell, but the Ottoman casualties were very high, and it bought time for the relief force which arrived from Sicily to relieve the rest of the besieged island. The star fort therefore played a crucial and decisive role in the siege.

After the fall of Venice to Napoleon, Corfu was occupied in 1797 by the French republican armies. The now ancient fortifications were still of some value at this point. A Russian–Ottoman–English alliance led at sea by Admiral Ushakov and with troops sent by Ali Pasha retook Corfu in 1799 after a four-month siege, when the garrison led by general Louis François Jean Chabot, being short of provisions and having lost the key island of Vido at the entrance of the port, surrendered and was allowed passage back to France.

Role in the military revolution 

According to Geoffrey Parker in his article, The Military Revolution 1560–1660: A Myth?, the appearance of the trace Italienne in early modern Europe, and the difficulty of taking such fortifications, resulted in a profound change in military strategy, most importantly, Parker argued, an increase in army sizes necessary to attack these forts. "Wars became a series of protracted sieges," Parker suggests, and open-pitch battles became "irrelevant" in regions where the trace Italienne existed. Ultimately, Parker argues, "military geography", in other words, the existence or absence of the trace Italienne in a given area, shaped military strategy in the early modern period. This is a profound alteration of the Military Revolution thesis originally proposed by Michael Roberts in 1955.

Parker's emphasis on the fortification as the key element has attracted substantial criticism from some academics, such as John A. Lynn and M. S. Kingra, particularly with respect to the claimed causal link between the new fortress design and increases in army sizes during this period.

Obsolescence 

In the nineteenth century, with the development of more powerful artillery and explosive shells, star forts were replaced by simpler but more robust polygonal forts. In the twentieth century, with the development of tanks and aerial warfare during and after the First World War, fixed fortifications became and have remained less important than in previous centuries.

Star forts reappeared during the early 21st century French intervention in Mali where they were built by the 17th Parachute Engineer Regiment.

See also 
 Venetian Works of Defence - A UNESCO World Heritage Site comprising six of the most outstanding examples of early bastion fort design.
 Suomenlinna - A later example of the bastion fort and a World Heritage Site, built in 1758. 
 Crenellation
 List of established military terms
 List of star forts
 Mathematics and architecture
Sébastien Le Prestre de Vauban
Menno van Coehoorn
 Erik Dahlberg

Notes

References
 af Hällström, Olof (2004) Sveaborg – The island fortress off Helsinki, 
 Duffy, C. (1975) Fire & Stone, The Science of Fortress Warfare 1660–1860,

External links 

 Cataneo, Hieronymus, De arte bellica, sive, De designandis ac construendis arcibus & propugnaculis, necnon & de ijs oppugnandis, expugnandis, ac propugnandis: de itinere exercitus, ac castrametatione: quando expediat manus cum hoste conserere, ac tandem, quid imperatori sit in procinctu cauendum vel eligendum, (1600)
Bastion fort at World Atlas
 Star castle in Netherlands

 
Warfare of the Early Modern period
Italian inventions